The 2006 Irish Professional Championship was a professional invitational snooker tournament which took place in October 2006. The tournament was held at the Spawell Sport & Leisure Complex in Templeogue, and featured sixteen exclusively Irish and Northern Irish players.

The last-16 and quarter-final matches were played over the best of nine frames, the semi-finals best of eleven and the final best of seventeen. Ken Doherty won the event, beating Michael Judge 9–4 in the final.

Main draw

Century breaks
140, 131, 116  Ken Doherty
132  David Morris
129  Joe Delaney
105  Michael Judge
104  Fergal O'Brien

References

Irish Professional Championship
Irish Professional Championship
Irish Professional Championship
Irish Professional Championship